The Moldefjorden is a fjord in Molde Municipality in Møre og Romsdal county, Norway. The fjord begins at the Julsundet strait (in the west) and heads east, past the city of Molde, then it continues flowing east along the northern side of the Molde archipelago and the island of Bolsøya, and ending at the entrance to the Fannefjorden.

See also
 List of Norwegian fjords

References

Fjords of Møre og Romsdal
Molde